Santa María Yalina is a town and municipality in Oaxaca in south-western Mexico.
It is part of the Villa Alta District in the center of the Sierra Norte Region.

As of 2000, the municipality had a total population of 378.

Zoogocho Zapotec is spoken in the town.

References

Municipalities of Oaxaca